Sharon L. Fries-Britt (born 1959?) is a professor of higher education at the University of Maryland, College Park.

Academic career
Fries-Britt received her PhD in 1994 from the University of Maryland, College Park where she now serves as a professor in the Department of Counseling, Higher Education, and Special Education. She was a fellow at the Consortium on Race, Gender, and Ethnicity at the University of Maryland. She was one of the research fellows on a $2.5 million grant for "broadening participation in physics" from the National Society of Black Physicists.

Investigations and reports
In 2018 she was invited with Adrianna Kezar to investigate and report on the "highly visible racial crisis in the 2015–16 academic year" at the University of Missouri. Stella M. Flores of New York University's Steinhardt Institute for Higher Education Policy commended the study at a time "when the nation and our colleges and universities are facing unprecedented demographic change, but faculty and leadership have not changed nearly as fast in terms of representation."

She serves on the American Institute of Physics National Task Force to Elevate African American Representation in Undergraduate Physics & Astronomy (TEAM-UP). After a two-year investigation, this group released a call for a $50 million program to increase the number of African-American physics and astronomy degree recipients in the US, at 3% in 2020.

Awards
She received the 2011 Mentoring Award for "noteworthy contributions" to "mentoring developing scholars" from the Association for the Study of Higher Education. In 2020 she received an Alumni Excellence award for "transformational" research from the University of Maryland Alumni Association.

Selected publications

References

External links
 Sharon Fries-Britt - UMD College of Education

Living people
African-American academics
University of Maryland, College Park faculty
Year of birth missing (living people)
21st-century African-American people